Jesús Guzmán Gareta (born 15 June 1926) is a Spanish actor, known for Death on High Mountain (1969) Crónicas de un pueblo (1971), Cachimba (2004) and Maestros (2000). He appeared in many western films shot in Almería such as Sartana Kills Them All (1970), For a Few Dollars More (1965), and Ocaso de un pistolero (1965).

He is the great-grandson of the actor Antonio Guzmán.

Selected filmography
Atraco a las tres (1962)
La gran familia (1962)
Implacable Three (1963)
Como dos gotas de agua (1963)
La historia de Bienvenido (1964)
For a Few Dollars More (1965)
Good Morning, Little Countess (1967)
The Locket (1970)
Sartana Kills Them All (1970)
Crónicas de un pueblo (1971)
Nothing Less Than a Real Man (1972)
And in the Third Year, He Rose Again (1980)
Maestros (2000)
Cachimba (2004)

References

External links

1926 births
Living people
Male actors from Madrid
Spanish male film actors
Spanish male television actors
Spanish male stage actors
Male Spaghetti Western actors
20th-century Spanish male actors
21st-century Spanish male actors